The 2016 Central Arkansas Bears football team represented the University of Central Arkansas in the 2016 NCAA Division I FCS football season. The Bears were led by third-year head coach Steve Campbell and played their home games at Estes Stadium. They were a member of the Southland Conference. They finished the season 10–3 overall and 8–1 in Southland play to finish in second place. They received an at-large bid to the FCS Playoffs where they defeated Illinois State in the first round, before losing in the second round to Eastern Washington.

Previous season
The Bears finished the season 7–4 overall and 7–2 in the conference.

Schedule
Source:  

 *-Indicates Game Broadcast via Tape Delay

Game summaries

Houston Baptist

Sources:

Samford

Sources:

Northwestern State

Sources:

@ Arkansas State

Sources:

@ Abilene Christian

Sources:

@ McNeese State

Sources:

Lamar (Homecoming)

Sources:

@ Southeastern Louisiana

Sources:

@ Stephen F. Austin

Sources:

Nicholls

Sources:

@ Sam Houston State

Sources:

FCS Playoffs

First Round–Illinois State

Sources:

Second Round–Eastern Washington

Sources:

Ranking movements

References

Central Arkansas
Central Arkansas Bears football seasons
Central Arkansas
Central Arkansas Bears football